Season 1982–83 was the 99th football season in which Dumbarton competed at a Scottish national level, entering the Scottish Football League for the 77th time, the Scottish Cup for the 88th time and the Scottish League Cup for the 36th time.

Overview 
For the eighth year in a row, Dumbarton played league football in Division 1, and after last season's disappointment, it was hoped that this season might bring the long hoped for promotion.  Indeed with only one defeat in the first eight games, confidence was high.  However, results became mixed thereafter, and it was to be a mid-table 7th place finish with 36 points, 22 behind champions St Johnstone.

In the Scottish Cup, Dumbarton fell at the first hurdle to fellow Division 1 opponents, Airdrie.

The League Cup was always going to be a challenge, with three Premier Division teams in the qualifying section - and this is how it was to prove, with all six matches ending in defeat - though it should be said that in none of the games were Dumbarton humiliated.

Locally, in the Stirlingshire Cup, Dumbarton reached the final for the third year in a row, and regained the trophy with a win over Stenhousemuir.

Results & fixtures

Scottish First Division

Scottish League Cup

Scottish Cup

Stirlingshire Cup

League table

Player statistics

Squad 

|}

Transfers
Amongst those players joining and leaving the club were the following:

Players in

Players out

Reserve team
Dumbarton competed in the Scottish Reserve League First Division (West) - Second Series, winning 1 and drawing 5 of 12 games - finishing 13th of 13.

Trivia
 The League match against Clyde on 2 October marked Tom Carson's 100th appearance for Dumbarton in all national competitions - the 86th Dumbarton player to reach this milestone.
 The League match against Raith Rovers on 16 October marked Raymond Blair's 200th appearance for Dumbarton in all national competitions - the 16th Dumbarton player to break the 'double century'.
 The final League match against Falkirk on 14 May marked Mark Clougherty's 100th appearance for Dumbarton in all national competitions - the 87th Dumbarton player to reach this milestone.

See also
 1982–83 in Scottish football

References

External links
Murray Bowman (Dumbarton Football Club Historical Archive)
Colin McKenzie (Dumbarton Football Club Historical Archive)
Alf Holton (Dumbarton Football Club Historical Archive)
Tom McAteer (Dumbarton Football Club Historical Archive)
Scottish Football Historical Archive

Dumbarton F.C. seasons
Scottish football clubs 1982–83 season